Philip Collins Stevens (February 15, 1893 – April 8, 1968) was a Canadian professional ice hockey centre who played hockey from 1911 until 1932.

Biography
Starting as an amateur, he turned professional in 1914 when he joined the Montreal Wanderers of the National Hockey Association (NHA), playing three seasons in the NHA and following the Wanderers to the National Hockey League (NHL), where he played four games before the team folded. He returned to the NHL for one season in 1921 with the Montreal Canadiens before moving to the Saskatoon Sheiks of the Western Canada Hockey League for three seasons. He played his final NHL season in 1925–26 with the Boston Bruins, and finished his career with stints in the minor Canadian–American Hockey League, Prairie Hockey League, and California Hockey League before retiring.

Career statistics

Regular season and playoffs

References

External links

1893 births
1968 deaths
Anglophone Quebec people
Boston Bruins players
Canadian ice hockey centres
Ice hockey people from Quebec
Montreal Canadiens players
Montreal Wanderers (NHA) players
Montreal Wanderers (NHL) players
People from Saint-Lambert, Quebec
Saskatoon Sheiks players